The 2021–22 Liga 3 is the sixth season of the Liga 3 under its current name, the seventh season under its current league structure, and the only amateur league football competition in Indonesia.

Persijap were the defending champions from the 2019 season after the 2020 season was cancelled due to COVID-19 pandemic in Indonesia.

Team changes 
The following teams changed division after the 2019 season.

Overview 
In this season, the regional round stage are not held due to COVID-19 pandemic, so teams that qualify from the provincial round will immediately qualify for the national round.

Regulations 
 The player was born 1 January 1999 to 31 December 2003
 It is allowed to register 5 (five) senior players with a maximum of 3 (three) senior players registered in the List of Players (DSP).
 The maximum number of registered players are 35 players
 The coach must have AFC C License
 The maximum number of registered team officials are 10
 Registration of players through the SIAP online system (PSSI Information and Administration System)

Provincial round 
These teams are the representatives from their provincial league to be competing in national round.

Notes:
 BOLD: Winner of each provincial league.
 Grey background denotes provinces that did not held province round.

National round 
A total of 64 teams are competing in this round.

First round 
In this first round, 64 teams divided into 16 groups. Each group played a home tournament basis. First round were played from 6 February 2022. Winner and runner-up of each group advanced to the second round.

Group A 
Five matches were held at the Benteng Stadium, Tangerang and one match was played at the PTIK Stadium, Jakarta.

Group B 
Five matches were held at the Benteng Stadium, Tangerang and one match was played at the PTIK Stadium, Jakarta.

Group C 
Five matches were held at the Jalak Harupat Stadium, Bandung Regency and one match was played at the Gelora Bandung Lautan Api Stadium, Bandung.

Group D 
Five matches were held at the Jalak Harupat Stadium, Bandung Regency and one match was played at the Gelora Bandung Lautan Api Stadium, Bandung.

Group E 
Five matches were held at the Galuh Stadium, Ciamis and one match was played at the Gelora Banjar Patroman Stadium, Banjar.

Group F 
Five matches were held at the Galuh Stadium, Ciamis and one match was played at the Gelora Banjar Patroman Stadium, Banjar.

Group G 
Five matches were held at the Kebondalem Stadium, Kendal Regency and one match was played at the Moh Sarengat Stadium, Batang.

Group H 
Five matches were held at the Kebondalem Stadium, Kendal Regency and one match was played at the Moh Sarengat Stadium, Batang.

Group I 
Five matches were held at the Gelora Joko Samudro Stadium, Gresik Regency and one match was played at the Semen Gresik Stadium, Gresik Regency.

Group J 
Five matches were held at the Gelora Joko Samudro Stadium, Gresik Regency and one match was played at the Semen Gresik Stadium, Gresik Regency.

Group K 
Five matches were held at the Gelora Delta Stadium, Sidoarjo Regency and one match was played at the Jenggolo Stadium, Sidoarjo Regency.

Group L 
Five matches were held at the Gelora Delta Stadium, Sidoarjo Regency and one match was played at the Jenggolo Stadium, Sidoarjo Regency.

Group M 
Five matches were held at the Brawijaya Stadium, Kediri and one match was played at the Canda Bhirawa Stadium, Kediri Regency.

Group N 
Five matches were held at the Brawijaya Stadium, Kediri and one match was played at the Canda Bhirawa Stadium, Kediri Regency.

Group O 
Four matches were held at the Gajayana Stadium, Malang and the rest were held at the Jenderal Sudirman Yon Zipur 5 Field and Yonif Para Raider 502/Ujwala Yudha Field, Malang Regency.

Group P 
Four matches were held at the Gajayana Stadium, Malang and the rest were held at the Brigif Para Raider 18/Trisula Field and Yonif Para Raider 502/Ujwala Yudha Field, Malang Regency.

Second round 
In this second round, 32 teams divided into eight groups. Each group played a home tournament basis. Second round were played from 16 February 2022. Winner and runner-up of each group advanced to the third round.

Group Q 
Five matches were held at the Benteng Stadium, Tangerang and one match was played at the PTIK Stadium, Jakarta.

Group R 
Five matches were held at the Jalak Harupat Stadium, Bandung Regency and one match was played at the Gelora Bandung Lautan Api Stadium, Bandung.

Group S 
Five matches were held at the Galuh Stadium, Ciamis and one match was played at the Gelora Banjar Patroman Stadium, Banjar.

Group T 
Five matches were held at the Kebondalem Stadium, Kendal Regency and one match was played at the Moh Sarengat Stadium, Batang.

Group U 
Five matches were held at the Gelora Joko Samudro Stadium, Gresik Regency and one match was played at the Semen Gresik Stadium, Gresik Regency.

Group V 
Five matches were held at the Gelora Delta Stadium, Sidoarjo Regency and one match was played at the Jenggolo Stadium, Sidoarjo Regency.

Group W 
Five matches were held at the Brawijaya Stadium, Kediri and one match was played at the Canda Bhirawa Stadium, Kediri Regency.

Group X 
Five matches were held at the Jala Krida AAL Stadium, Surabaya and one match was played at the Jenggolo Stadium, Sidoarjo Regency.

Third round 
In this third round, 16 teams were divided into four groups. Each group was played on a home tournament basis. Third round were played from 6 March 2022 which were held at the Gelora Joko Samudro Stadium, Gresik Regency and Gelora Delta Stadium, Sidoarjo Regency. Winner and runner-up of each group promoted to Liga 2. Winner of each group also advanced to the semi-finals.

Group AA

Group BB

Group CC

Group DD

Knockout stage 
All times listed below are UTC+7.

Semi-finals

Final

Top goalscorers

See also 
 2021–22 Liga 1
 2021–22 Liga 2

References 

Liga 3 (Indonesia)
Liga 3 (Indonesia) seasons
2021 in Indonesian football
2021 in Indonesian football leagues
2021 in Indonesian sport
2021–22 in Asian third tier association football leagues